The following is a list of the characters from the animated children's series Iggy Arbuckle. It consists of main, secondary, minor, and one-off characters.

Primary characters

Iggy Arbuckle

Iggy Arbuckle, voiced by Jonathan Wilson, is the title character of the animated children's series Iggy Arbuckle, and the show's main protagonist. He is a white pig with large, aquamarine eyes, who wears a green forest ranger's uniform and a hat which has a ranger's badge on it.

Occupations
He is the keeper of the Kookamunga. He has vast knowledge of the wilderness, and is in charge of making sure everything goes in proper order. However, in "A Whale of a Tale", Sir Percy Nibblemore reveals that Iggy only has authority over what goes on on dry land.

Pig Rangers
Iggy has been a nature lover since childhood, and has created a fictional worldwide organization dubbed the "Pig Rangers". These are a special type of forest ranger devoted to learning about and taking exceptional care of the global environment. Unfortunately, aside from Jiggers, there are no other official members (of any long-lasting standards). Pig Rangers in training are called "Pig Scouts". Iggy was apparently still a pig scout in the original comic strip, as this was what he refers to himself as in the dialogue, instead of a pig ranger.

As seen in "The Things We Do for Mud," the final exam to become a Pig Ranger has three steps:

Memorizing an entire book called "Pig Ranger Facts and Lore", which contains voluminous quantities of facts on nature.
Testing one's tracking abilities.
Writing a poem to express one's undying love for nature.

The Pig Rangers have a special chant, which is recited after any great victory ("Oh, oink-a-bula, oink-a-bula, oink-a-bula, onh!"), and is accompanied by a dance.

Old Rusty
A special gadget he possesses for his job is "Old Rusty", a one-of-a-kind pig-scout pocket device which contains many trinkets inside (e.g., a lemon grater, an eagle-calling whistle, and a boat motor). Jiggers sometimes adds new touches to Old Rusty, and has placed a homing device on it, seen in "Ol' Trusty".

Character
Iggy is generally portrayed as an active, adventurous, out-going young pig, who is willing to take big risks to stand up for what he believes in. However, this attitude is inconsistent in some episodes. For instance, in "If Pigs Could Fly", after taking in an orphaned condor egg, and raising the newly hatched chick, he constantly frets over her well-being (worrying if she's eating enough, getting the right exercise, might confuse Iggy, Jiggers or Zoop as her parents instead of the condor puppet Jiggers made to guide her with, etc.) and basically acts like a stereotypical father.

Despite being generally skeptical, he believes in luck, and possesses a good luck charm - a toothpick he calls "Ozwald". He enjoys reading mystery novels, which inspire him to do his own detective work in "The Case of the Messy Marauder".

Ancestry
Iggy is descended from a long line of explorers, all of whom have made great discoveries. These people are modeled from famous historical explorers. His great-great-grandfather, Figgy Arbuckle, was the first of his ancestors to come to the Kook. Figgy's son, Twiggy, planted an oak tree near Mooseknuckle, which Iggy affectionately called "Alvin", before it died in "Iggy's Family Tree". In the same episode, Jiggers gave Iggy a new tree to plant which he called Bonnie.

Mannerisms
Iggy has displayed a number of unique mannerisms; the most notable of which is that his snout twitches when he's lying. This concept draws parallels to Pinocchio, as both characters have involuntary nasal quirks which only occur when they're being dishonest. If his nasal septum gets displaced, Iggy will snore while sleeping, and his snoring can produce a village-wrecking earthquake. Luckily, this only happens in "I am Iggy, Hear Me Snore".

At the end of "A Whale of a Tale", Iggy gets bombarded with details about ways in which he physically expresses his moods, with Kira saying he picks his teeth when worried, Spiff saying he scratches his neck when embarrassed, and Jiggers saying his face turns a certain way when he becomes annoyed. He also tends towards hyperactivity and anxiousness if he has nothing to keep him occupied.

Iggy's greatest fear is apparently having to leave the Kookamunga and live in the noisy, chaotic atmosphere of the city. In "Art For Iggy's Sake", it is revealed that, while he is not very talented at most varieties of art, he does have an expertise in photography. Iggy temporarily owned a pet caterpillar in "Honey, I Ate the Bug". He named the caterpillar "Furry", and taught him to dance to his whistling. Iggy also loves spicy foods.

Jiggers

Jiggers, voiced by David Berni, is a beaver, and Iggy's closest friend.

Appearance
He wears blue overalls with a light-blue grid pattern, and a red baseball-style cap backwards. He has a pink nose, and his right eye is extended, and vertically longer than the left eye. Being somewhat of an over-eater, he is rather heavy-set.

An interesting thing to note is the character's close resemblance in design to the character Quiggums in "Dugly Uckling in: Treasure Quest"; an episode of Random Cartoons which has also been created by Iggy Arbuckles creator, Guy Vasilovich.

Relations
Iggy and Jiggers often call each other "Igg" and "Jigg". Though they are inseparable best friends, they have disagreements on many things. Jiggers is quicker to buy into trends, or fall for scams, than Iggy, and therefore gets irritated by Iggy's skepticism. Jiggers also prefers to relax, and gets worn by Iggy's energetic behaviour. This even prompted him to hide from Iggy in "One Fine Day", when Iggy had accomplished all of his tasks ahead of his schedule, and frantically wanted to find something to do, but Jiggers just wanted to soak in his mud bath. When arguing, they sometimes call it off by "agreeing to disagree", and then spitting in each other's faces (though someone is usually standing between them, and therefore suffers the consequences).

Jiggers has a nephew named Chip, who idolized Iggy for a while because Iggy was more courageous and daring than Jiggers. He and Kira have sometimes glanced at each other in an arguably dreamy way, and say complimentary things about each other, such as in "Yawny Come Lately", "Any Friend of Yours", and "Tower of Beaver". Although not proven, they have an incipient love affair.

Character
He is the only official "Pig Ranger" other than Iggy (though Catfish Stu temporarily became one in "The Things We do for Mud"), and is also a skilled mechanic and wood sculptor. He prides himself on his teeth, which play a major part in his work, and does his best to take care of them even ordering in an electrical toothbrush, called the Incisor 3000 with extra gadgets in "Mooseknuckle Unplugged".

Jiggers has a strong tail; it is capable of creating a wind current or digging a hole. However, in "The Things We Do for Mud", it is shown that Jiggers has an unbearably itchy tail, which is why he sometimes smears "miracle mud" on his tail in large quantities (while not liking when Iggy talks about itching of Jiggres' tail in public). He is also a proficient knitter, once knitting an entire condor-shaped handpuppet in a matter of seconds. He is afraid of many things, notably spiders and the Heebie-Jeebies Forest, and tends to bang his tail on the ground when worried. He also has many allergies, the most prominent apparently being to goldenrod. Although his allergy to ragweed has proven much more severe as he reacted much more violently to it in "Scents and Sensibility" than he did to the golden rod in a previous episode. Due to his allergies and phobias, he is hesitant to take risks, but it usually doesn't take much persuasion to get him to do something. All the same, he regularly asks Iggy if he may just supervise, while Iggy does the dangerous work. Jiggers is also obsessed with being prepared for the worst, and tends to overpack on any trip.

Jiggers is fond of magic tricks; and possesses several books on how to be a magician. This caused a problem in "Sticking Together", when he accidentally chained Iggy and Spiff together with one of his tricks.

History
Jiggers wasn't always afraid of spiders, but in "Courage Under Fur", Iggy tells Zoop that Jiggers' arachnaphobia developed after he awoke in the middle of the night to find a small spider sitting on his nose.

In "When Iggy Met Jiggers", it is revealed that Jiggers originally worked for Catfish Stu when he came to the Kookamunga. Iggy kept a close watch over Jiggers' actions, and when Stu ordered Jiggers to cut down all the trees in the forest, Iggy persuaded him not to do it. Stu had told Jiggers, earlier, that Iggy was untrustworthy, which Jiggers allowed himself to believe, so Iggy asked him to listen to the forest itself. He did, and decided not to kill the trees, after which he quit his job as a henchman to Stu, and joined Iggy as a Pig Ranger.

Secondary characters

ZoopZoop, originally voiced by Stephanie Milo and later by Stephanie Anne Mills, is a chipmunk, and another friend of Iggy and Jiggers. The character has been classified as a hippie.

Appearance and Occupations
She has large, soft, blue eyes, and wears a short pink dress with a purple flower embroidered on her chest. While most of the characters go barefoot, she wears a pair of white geta sandals. She runs the local refreshment shop, beauty parlour, and general store, which is merely called "Zoop's". She also keeps a vegetable and flower garden. She prefers for her products to be organically grown, made, or produced.

Character
Although none of the characters' ages has ever been determined, Zoop is apparently several years younger than most of the other characters. She is very athletic, skilled at yoga, and fond of Karma and meditation. She is sweet and nurturing, and generally tries to support her friends. Although she, like the other characters, despises Catfish Stu, she still gives him advice (though he never asks for it) and even keeps gourmet food reserved for him due to his limited tastes (she may not like him, but a paying customer is a paying customer). She is very serene, and doesn't lose her temper often, but when she does, her friends hastily try to get back on her good side.

History
A little is given on her history in "Scents and Sensibility". When she is describing what different smells remind her of, she mentions that she used to dye shirts in blackberry juice with her father (who, in the flashbacks, appears to be a hippie), and have frequent tea parties with her grandmother. She apparently has been to several places in the world, as she also mentions a trip she took to China. Also, in "Art For Iggy's Sake", she says that she learned how to make hammocks when she was in South America.

Facts
In "A Whale of a Tale" she tells Kira that, while she doesn't know it fluently, she knows several phrases in "whale talk". As shown in "The Case of the Messy Marauder", when she listens to books on tape in her sleep, they subconsciously cause her to sleepwalk, and perform activities based on the topics of the tape.

In the original comic strip from the June 2004 NGKids issue, it is mentioned that her birthday is around the first day of summer. It is unknown whether or not this is canonical to the series, as although the episode "Scents and Sensibility focuses on her birthday, the time of year is uncertain.

Major appearances
"Courage Under Fur" - She hypnotizes Jiggers so he won't be afraid of spiders anymore.
"Tower of Beaver" - She's arguing with Spiff.
"The Case of the Messy Marauder" - She is frightened because someone - or something - keeps stealing from her store in the night.
"Oh Brother, Where Art Thou?" - After being saved from stampeding hippos by Robear, she believes he has a "blue aura" (or inner wisdom). When he starts clowning around in her store, she loses faith in her ability to sense such things.
"Scents and Sensibility" - It's her birthday, and she inadvertently helps Iggy and Jiggers to decide what to give her.

SpiffSpiff, voiced by Derek McGrath, is a street cleaning skunk. He wears a greenish-beige hat, a beige shirt, brown trousers, and is usually seen carrying a trash-picking stick.

Occupations
Spiff's duty is to keep the Kook clean, and he takes this job very seriously, even going so far as to clean up after others when he's away from Mooseknuckle. He gets extremely angry whenever anyone litters, rather than properly dispose of their trash. He considers tourists to be a problem, since they tend to be careless litterbugs. Even so, he grows bored and restless when there's a long period in which no one litters. In his spare time, he uses the tin cans he recycles to make little statues and figurines, as seen in "Art For Iggy's Sake". As a second job, he occasionally writes articles for the Kookamunga Scoop, Mooseknuckle's local news magazine.

Character
Along with being so adamant about public cleanliness, Spiff has proven himself to be very testy in general. He has argued with Zoop in many episodes, often over very minor details. When pushed to the limits, he will release a stench cloud, much to the horror of everyone present. He has actually only been shown releasing his stench once, in "The Way of the Skunk", when it was quickly masked by the robot. On two other occasions, in "A Bird in the Hoof" and "One Fine Day", he nearly sprays, but something happens in each instance to stop him.

Facts
Spiff has a powerful operatic singing voice, as heard in "The Unsung Hero". He normally only sings in the shower, but in this episode, Iggy and Jiggers called upon him to sing for the cactuses in the desert after Zoop, who normally fulfills this job, went down with Laryngitis. He is skilled at martial arts, and on numerous occasions has applied this talent to his trash-picking routines. In "Sticking Together", he is shown to have a strong sense of smell, which also applies to his job usefully.

Major appearances
"The Way of the Skunk" - Spiff quits his job after a robot Iggy and Jiggers bought to help him begins doing all the work. When it gets out of control, and destroys things which aren't trash, Zoop helps to train Spiff so he can compete to get his job back.
"Tower of Beaver" - He's arguing with Zoop.
"Sticking Together" - When Spiff gets chained to Iggy, they have to learn how to work together to get their jobs done.
"The Unsung Hero" - Spiff has to sing for the cactuses in the desert while Zoop is sick, if he wants her to be able to use their needles to help his sore back.

KiraKira, voiced by Novie Edwards is a rat, and another protagonist in the show.

Appearance and occupations
Kira wears a purple T-shirt which shows off her belly, pink pants with a green scarf around her waist like a belt, pink bracelets on each wrist, and black slipper-like shoes. She has long, orange-red hair, tied back in a ponytail. She runs the tourist kiosk, and also keeps the Kookamunga Museum. In her spare time, she has many interests, such as mountain climbing, architecture, or videography, and pursues at least one per week, usually saying "I'm all about (whatever her current hobby is) this week!".

Character
Kira is native to the city, and is a relatively new resident of Mooseknuckle. Therefore, she is unfamiliar with most of the Kook's traditions and folklore, but still enjoys learning about them and getting in on them. Of the regular cast (the characters who are featured in the opening credits), she is the most infrequently seen.

Kira and Jiggers have, on more than one occasion, given each other glances, complimented each other, and are shown in "Any Friend of Yours" to have many things in common. It remains unclear, however, what the status of their relationship is.

Major appearances
"There's Something about Berries" - Her first speaking role. She secretly saves the day by "moonlighting as a chef" after Catfish Stu steals the juniper berry bushes from Rattler's Pass.
"Any Friend of Yours" - She and Jiggers begin to hang out with each other, and Iggy feels left out.
"Voyage to the Bottom of the Lake" - She helps Iggy and Jiggers in mission of saving the ship called The Gold Bark from Stu.
"Tower of Beaver" - She helps Jiggers in building the tower.
"X-Treme Iggy" - She tapes Iggy's extreme on camera, but her tape is stolen by Stu what makes her angry.
"Art for Iggy's Sake" - She pushes Iggy to find his medium in art.
"Good Scavenger Hunting" - She judges the competition what inside it are Iggy and Stu in finding any sculpture to her museum.
"When Iggy Met Jiggers" - She listens to Iggy and Jiggers as they tell the story of Jiggers' arrival in Mooseknuckle.

Catfish StuartCatfish Stu (full first name Stuart), voiced by James Rankin, is Iggy's enemy, and the show's main antagonist.

Appearance
Stu is a unibrowed catfish with brown eyes, a two-part moustache, a goatee, blue-green lips, yellow scales, and sharp teeth. He wears a light-blue jacket, a light-brown shirt, and blue trousers.

Occupations
Stu owns "Stu's Adventure Camp", a rusting trailer park with few visitors, but is always looking for a way to make a fast buck, usually at everyone else's expense. He has two henchmen, both ferrets, who do most of the work for him. His plans eventually lead to trouble, usually resulting in Stu and his henchmen getting chased or being forced to undo all the damage they did.

Character
Stu is greedy, and bent on becoming a millionaire. He is also self-centered, cynical and egotistical; believing himself to be above everyone else in Mooseknuckle, frequently calling them all "Mooseknuckleheads", and seeing nature as nothing more than a disposable resource to implement his plans. Along with that, he is somewhat of a picky eater, insisting on feeding only on gourmet food, and openly mocking and criticizing Zoop's health-concerned, all-natural-ingredient food products. Despite his upper-class desires, he's apparently cheap as well, as he buys second-hand rowboats, which he keeps locked up in a shed so no one else knows about them. He commonly says "I have a finny feeling" rather than "I have a funny feeling". When he gets a money-making idea, his eyes often roll like slots machines, and turn into dollar signs.

Family
Stu has a mother named Stella, who came to the Kookamunga in "The Kindness of Rangers", believing it to be Stu's birthday. He apparently has a younger brother named Stanley, though he has not yet been seen in the series (although a picture of him was shown in the same episode.) All we know of Catfish Stanley is that his zodiac symbol is a pisces, and he is more successful in business than Stu. Stu also owns a stuffed octopus named "Legsy", whom he is very fond of. He always sleeps with Legsy, and tends to go into a mild despair whenever it goes missing.

Robear and RobertRobear and Robert, voiced by Patrick McKenna and Neil Crone, are Catfish Stu's henchmen. They are commonly referred to as "the Ferret Brothers" or colloquially, "the Ferrets".

Appearance
Robear (deceased)  (voiced by McKenna) speaks with a French accent, and wears a beret, a white shirt with red horizontal stripes, and blue jeans. Robert (voiced by Crone) wears a light-blue shirt and dark blue jeans. Both of them have pale blue eyes. It has yet to be explained why Robert's accent is different.

Occupations
The ferrets usually can be seen carrying Stu around in his fishbowl on a stretcher, similarly to how the Ancient Egyptian pharaohs were transported.
When his money-making schemes involve heavy labour, they are the ones who do it. Despite all the trouble they go through for their boss, he never sees their work as satisfactory, and they repeatedly get called lazy (and other demeaning terms), are forced to sleep under a rock, and their position as his henchmen is sometimes threatened. When abused too severely, they have abandoned him - even in bad situations - but have always returned due to their loyal nature.

The ferrets briefly worked for Iggy in "Fair Is Ferret", because he was nice to them. However, he didn't want them stealing things for him from around the park, or tying up the other residents (an acknowledged talent of theirs), so he devised a plan to make them work for Stu again.

Character
Robear's ultimate goal is to please Stu, and he is normally first to compliment him or give him something (which is usually stolen). Both ferrets have displayed a love of stealing on ample occasions."Pandamonium/Ghost of a Chance"; While Catfish Stu is trying to get Zoop to sell his bottled water, he is unaware that his henchmen are stuffing their pockets with hundreds of objects off of the shelves. Zoop notices, however, and snips their pockets open to let the goods out, upon which each of them claims the other was going to pay for it all. Be that as it may, Robear can also be thoughtful, emotional, and considerate. This is clearly seen in "Oh Brother, Where art Thou?". However, he sometimes puts this alter-ego to work-related use, as in "Scents and Sensibility" (after failing to make a good-smelling perfume for Stu's latest scheme, the ferrets notice Iggy and Jiggers making a perfume for Zoop. Robear then offers them some bottling advice in hopes of getting an opportunity to swap the perfumes). Robert isn't quite as quick-thinking as his brother, and is very timid. Therefore, he usually just does as told, but often spills the beans over something which was supposed to be kept secret.

Brotherly relationship
Deep down they have a strong brotherly love, but their relationship is strained. Robert's stupidity sometimes gets to Robear, and they frequently get into arguments, some of which are physical. Robear will even bang Robert on the head with a hammer if he cheats when they play checkers. He openly admits that he considers himself to be the better of the two in "Koo Koo Achoo":

A running gag with them is that they switch positions every now and then. For instance, when in a backhoe together, Robear may be in the left seat and Robert in the right, but if the screen moves to a different shot and then returns, Robert will now be in the left seat and Robear is in the right.

Stereotypes
The Ferret Brothers fall into a number of stereotypical categories. They share many assumed traits of ferrets; e.g., getting depressed when separated, being afraid of deep water, and seemingly subconsciously snooping through other's belongings and taking whatever their hearts desire. Robear's habit of behaving melodramatically may be an allude to his origins. They are also stereotypical henchmen, in that despite their greatest efforts, they are perpetually in trouble with their boss, and they are poorly educated.

Major appearances
"Fair Is Ferret" - The ferrets quit working for Stu, and work for Iggy instead. Because he doesn't have anything for them to do, however, they go out of control.
"Oh Brother, Where art Thou?" - After Zoop rewards him for saving her life, Robear spends all his time at her store, and Robert goes into a depression without him.
"Scents and Sensibility" - They set out all over the Kook to find something which smells nice, so they can use it in a perfume for Stu.
Unstable Fables - Shadows in Burray - Robear sadly dies of sickness Robear almost died twice,  so Butch wants to be with Murray Hare.. Then Robear was dying and so he called Crystal Tortoise, Katia, The Bratz, Walter Tortoise, Alia, Catherine, Teenage Murray Hare and Butch Hare to the funeral bedroom. but he was told that if Butch doesn't want to be with his dad, then he must find his new friend, Selena,. Robear then passes away and is buried in a coffin, He was then sent away in the pond

The Great BamzeaniThe Great BamzeaniThis is how you spell Bamzeani is a large, sentient, 200-year-old totem pole that stands in the middle of Mooseknuckle. It used to be three fur traders named Yahank, Shmeaka and Frank; who came from a fictional country called UkanBetistan. In the Kookamunga, they captured the spirit Yawny Yumpalot. Yawny claimed that if they released him, he would grant them three wishes, but upon being released, he cursed them so they would sit on each other's shoulders for all eternity; thereby turning them into a totem pole. They spend their time watching the goings-on in Mooseknuckle, and offering advice to those who ask for it. Though Jiggers disapproves of the Great Bamzeani's advice, citing it as nonsense, Iggy asks them for advice whenever there is a major problem. The Great Bamzeani's answers always come in the form of riddles that Iggy must work out for himself.

Although they give their advice generously, all three of the figures have displayed arrogant behaviour at times. The one at the top (most likely Yahank) often comments on his apparent "good looks", and they all have said that they're always right.

Major appearances
"How Much Wood Can a Wood Pecker Peck?" - The Great Bamzeani is in danger of being pecked to death by a flock of woodpeckers who have strangely shown up in Mooseknuckle.
"Yawny Come Lately" - The story on the three fur traders and how they became a totem pole is given.

Natives and minor characters

Ninja polar bears
The ninja polar bears are mercenaries of Brain Freeze who can be hired. They wear white scarves around their heads, fight using swordfish like swords, and "speak" with a Japanese accent. In "A Dip in the Pole", Stu hired them to stop Iggy and Jiggers from finding the belongings of Admiral "Brrrrrd" at the "Norse Pole", but Iggy outsmarted them. A few of them were also seen in "Xtreme Iggy", when they became fans of Iggy's "Extreme Toucaning". They are frequently seen in other episodes where Brainfreeze is featured.

Stray Warthog tribe
A tribe of warthogs, native to the Kook, who wear red baseball-style caps. Their leader, Harley (voiced by George Buza), has no sense of direction, and thus they are forever trying to find their special emerald. When they aren't lost, they live in a teepee village. Jiggers temporarily became their monarch in "The Beaver Who Would be King", because he wore the same style of hat as they. He enjoyed this position until Harley asked him to retrieve the emerald from Hissabiss. After successfully fetching it out of the canyon (though it ended up rolling away into the forest), Jiggers and Iggy escaped back to Mooseknuckle. Jiggers was concerned over how he could hide away from the tribe, but they were too busy running after the emerald to notice he was gone. They were among the park residents who gave signatures for the highway petition in "Petition Impossible". In "Ghost of a Chance", a few past members of the tribe are seen in the flashback as Iggy tells Jiggers the legend of two miners who upset a group of native's nighttime rituals.

QuilpieQuilpie, voiced by Katie Bergin is a kangaroo and Mooseknuckle's courier. She speaks with an Australian accent, wears a blue courier's uniform, and has blue eyes and blonde hair tied back. She is extremely punctual, and does not like for anything to be late. She seems to be rather eccentric, as in "Petition Impossible", Zoop asked her to wait a few more minutes when she became impatient while waiting for Iggy and Jiggers to give her the petition but Quilpie told her that would disrupt the delivery schedules, and went on a fast-paced, step-by-step concept of what exactly might happen. Quilpie can later be seen in "Koo Koo Achoo". She was in the lineup to buy the bobbleheads which Jiggers had carved, but did not receive any lines.

SpelvinSpelvin, voiced by James Rankin, is a hermit crab who never comes out of his house unless there's something in it for him. In "Petition Impossible", when Iggy and Jiggers were trying to get 200 signatures for the petition to save the Kookamunga from being turned into a highway, they tried to get him to sign. He made them do a ton of work on his house first, took Jiggers' bottle cap collection (which didn't suit with Jiggers), and sent them on their way without signing. In "The Case of the Messy Marauder", Kira mentions that she has written poetry with Spelvin, and that he's pretty good at rhyming.

Lost city citizens
Chameleons who live in the self-sufficient but legendary Lost City. The city is said to have roads paved in gold (which turns out to be golden rod), an eternally moderate temperature, and beautiful architecture. The Chameleons have relocated 28 times because they are unable to trust outsiders who come to the city. They pride themselves on their culture, which involves unique music and cubist art.

Tomato and StokeTomato and Stoke are two teenage monkeys, a boy and a girl, who are fanatics when it comes to Extreme sports. Tomato is female (voiced by Stacey DePass) and Stoke is male (voiced by Noam Zylberman). Stoke's attire is usually yellow and orange, while Tomato's is purple and lilac. They are usually seen waterskiing, snowboarding, etc., and constantly pepper their speech with words like "dude" and "gnarly".

Their most prominent appearance was in "Extreme Iggy", when upon seeing Iggy doing his tricks with the toucans, they and several other background characters immediately delved into the new sport of "Extreme Toucaning". They quickly lost interest in it, though, upon watching the penguins of Brain Freeze surfing through the snow on each other (or "Extreme Penguining"). In "Petition Impossible", Stoke and another male monkey were asked by Iggy to give their signatures. They then rolled him down one of Brain Freeze's mountains in a giant snowball, to speed up his trip back to the mainland of the park.

It's possible that the uncle of Stoke or the other male was seen in "Ol' Trusty", as when Stu is telling a grown-up monkey to get in line-up to buy another "Ol' Trusty", the monkey protests "But I want another Ol' Trusty for my nephew!".

Wingnut
 Iggy Arbuckle character  Wingnut Gender  Male Color  OrangeEye Color  YellowSpecies  FoxFirst appearance  "A Whale of a Tale/Big Toe's Faux Paw "Portrayer  David Berni

Wingnut, voiced by David Berni, is a fox who is reputed to be crazy. He wears a black vest with white puffy sleeves and a number of odd ornaments such as a monocle and an aviator helmet, and rides around on a bicycle. In "A Whale of a Tale", he designs an airplane that runs on maple syrup; which he claims has great mileage. He later compliments Iggy for his heading in the Kookamunga Scoop: "Local Pig thinks he sees Unicorn Whale".

Wingnut was seen at the end of "The Case of the Messy Marauder", when Iggy, desperate for another case, noticed Wingnut was acting perfectly normally, and grew suspicious. He later made an appearance in "Koo Koo Achoo", in which he kept getting the tomato sauce from the toxic tomatoes splashed all over him. He can also be seen at the party in "The Great Kookamunga Standoff".

Bigtoe
 Iggy Arbuckle character  Bigtoe Gender  Referred to as male by the characters Color  Uncertain; depicted as dark brownEye Color  UncertainSpecies  Bigtoe (Parody of Bigfoot)First appearance  "A Whale of a Tale/Big Toe's Faux Paw "Portrayer  None
A Bigfoot-like creature, believed by many to be a myth. Iggy disbelieves in Bigtoe, but Jiggers is a staunch believer, and even carries a research kit in his backpack for any possible clues to the creature's existence. In "Bigtoe's Faux Paw", a fake Bigtoe was the focus of one of Catfish Stu's scams, until Iggy and the gang revealed his deception. However, an enormous, shadowy creature was seen at the end of the episode, implying that it may be real.

The weevils
The weevils are tiny, bug-like creatures who live in the marsh of the Wet Wally's Rainforest. They feed off of nothing but water hyacinths. In "Resident Weevil", after the water hyacinth Robear had stolen from Zoop, for Stu, had multiplied into thousands, and they were taking up all the oxygen in the lake, Iggy called upon the weevils to eat the hyacinths up. When they had eaten every last one of them, they were starving, and began a huge protest against this "unfair treatment". When Iggy found out about this, he struck up a bargain with their leader Monty (voiced by Richard Binsley); in ten minutes he and Jiggers would return them to their marsh (where the hyacinths naturally grow), which they did.

Visitors to the Kookamunga

Manly Boarman
 Iggy Arbuckle character  Manly Foreman Gender  MaleColor  Pinkish-whiteHair Colour  BlackEye Color  BlueSpecies  PigFirst appearance  "Idle Worship/There's Something about Berries"Portrayer  Unknown
An Australian pig, who is famous for his adventures in nature. In "Idle Worship", he came to visit the Kookamunga, and Iggy and Jiggers acted as guides. Unfortunately, Manly had gotten caught up in the glamour of celebrityhood and the paparazzi, and had lost his touch with nature. By the end of the story, though, he claimed to have been re-inspired by Iggy and Jiggers.

Barry Bullevardo
 Iggy Arbuckle character  Barry Bullevardo Gender  MaleColor  Dark brownEye Color  BlackSpecies  BullFirst appearance  "Lights, Camera! Distraction!/Fish and Chip off the Old Block"Portrayer  Juan ChioranBarry Bullevardo, voiced by Juan Chioran, is a Spanish or Mexican bull, who not only directs, but produces and stars in his movies. He wears a red beret, a gold chain with a gold ornament around his neck, a gold ring in his nose, and a light beige suit.

Role in the series
Barry is currently the only minor or guest character in the show to have had two major appearances.
In "Lights, Camera! Distraction!", he tried to produce a movie in the Kookamunga, though Iggy had to explain to him that his filming set-ups were going to harm the wildlife and their natural habitats. Later, in "Nature's Calling", he returned to the Kookamunga; this time to get restored by nature. Catfish Stu, however, tried to get him involved with creating a "natural" health spa, complete with electric palm trees, a giant telephone made entirely of rock, a volcano that spews out fireworks, and a geyser which erupts iced tea. However, Barry thought about it, and decided that wasn't what he came to the Kook for, and left Stu to deal with it alone. He then, after hearing a story about Big Toe, left the Kookamunga to produce a movie about the legendary creature.

He later made a silent appearance at the party in "The Great Kookamunga Standoff".

Character
Barry appears to be optimistic and amiable, and typically calls his acquaintances "amigo", "muchacho" or "muchachito". He gets emotional to the point of crying, whenever he hears a deragatory comment or slur directed at bulls (e.g., "You're like a bull in a china shop!") or when someone tells him off. Similarly to Catfish Stu, he seems motivated by money, and jumps at every movie making opportunity he discovers. He doesn't know very much about nature, as revealed in "Nature's Calling", since he cannot name flowers, wonders why they aren't plastic instead, and cannot name animals or birds either.

Barry either is or has been married, as one of the things he puts Jiggers in charge with, after hiring him as a footman, is his mother-in-law.

Sir Percy NibblemoreSir Percival "Percy" Nibblemore, voiced by Derek McGrath, is an evil, British marine biologist. He is a gray goat with brown eyes, and wears a blue wool sweater, dark gray trousers, a blue toque, spectacles and an orange life jacket. In "A Whale of a Tale", he intended on capturing the narwhal Iggy had sited in Brainfreeze. Iggy and the gang tried to use a tape with a danger warning for the narwhal to leave, but Percy found them out, and successfully stole the tape. He then found the "narwhal", and captured it, but it turned out to be Jiggers' boat he had been working on. Percy, annoyed, left with his three assistants on that; but was seen again at the party in "The Great Kookamunga Standoff", where he was surprisingly welcomed.

PrincePrince, voiced by Kedar Brown, is a friend of Kira's, from the city. He is a bodybuilding dog with brown hair and golden-brown eyes. He wears a yellow tee-shirt with a red collar and red cuffs, and blue jeans. During his visit to the Kookamunga, Catfish Stu tried to get Iggy replaced by Prince. While Prince was initially flattered by the idea, he pointed out that Iggy contains knowledge on nature "it would take me a lifetime to learn!" Iggy and Jiggers did, however, declare him an honorary Pig Ranger. His muscles and charm tend to cause females to collapse in a dreamy manner.

ChipChip, voiced by Cameron Ansell, is Jiggers' nephew. He has brown eyes, and wears a light turquoise shirt and blue overalls with red straps. He also wears a red baseball cap like his uncle's. When he first came to the Kookamunga in "Pig-Coloured Glasses, he idolized Iggy for his bravery and fearless attitude, but after Jiggers saved them both from quicksand, he saw what a great uncle he had. He was seen at the party in "The Great Kookamunga Standoff", though he had no speaking lines. He calls everyone he meets either "uncle" or "auntie".

The raccoon family
The raccoon family are tourists who stayed at Catfish Stu's "eco-friendly" resort in "Mooseknuckle Unplugged". Because Catfish Stu was overusing the energy from the power generators, the music he played was too loud, the water in the swimming pool too hot, and the air conditioning too cold. This dissatisfied the family, and the mother (Voiced by Ellen-Ray Hennessy; credited as Ellen Ray Snow) demanded that he give them a refund. When he refused, she mildly threatened to claw him, and he gave in.

Catfish StellaCatfish Stella, voiced by Paul Haddad, is Catfish Stu's mother. She speaks with a Southern drawl, and wears a pink dress which reaches right to the ground, a pink bonnet, and carries a pink fan, making her resemble a southern belle. She greatly resembles Stu, except her lips are magenta and her unibrow is curved instead of rectangular. Character-wise, she is the exact opposite of her son: polite, friendly and open-hearted, and generally never says a bad thing about anyone if she can help it.

Stella came to the Kookamunga in "The Kindness of Rangers", because she believed it to be Stu's birthday (though it actually was his younger brother, Stanley's, birthday). She is convinced that Iggy, Jiggers and Zoop are all good friends of Stu's. She doesn't approve of Robear and Robert, believing them to be a bad influence on Stu (even though they are his hired henchmen).

She is apparently very fond of flowers, and ordered her son not to kill off the flower bushes in the forest just to clear room for a golf course. In "The Fish Who Came for Dinner", Stu tells Iggy and Jiggers that he would have stayed at his mother's house while the crane family hatched its eggs, but her karate group got there first.

The ParrotThe Parrot''', voiced by Neil Crone, is an abandoned pet, left behind at Stu's Adventure Camp. Stu at first thought that he could use the bird to make money; tourists might like to dine with a parrot, for example. However, the parrot twisted up everything he said (as he normally does), and Stu feared that the tourists would get the wrong opinion about his camp. He told Robert and Robear to abandon the parrot in the rainforest; where Iggy and Jiggers found out about the parrot, and took him in. The parrot's crazy phrases ("Iggy the Big Kook!", "Worry! Don't count on Jiggers!''", etc.) made them decide that Zoop, who has more patience with such things, should take care of him. She was willing to at first, but soon he even got to her. After causing the whole town to get into a huge street-fight with his wild remarks, he finally found a friend in Spiff, who, as Iggy says "Is the only one who gets him!". He gets choked at the end of the episode by the closing screen.

See also
Iggy Arbuckle#Episodes

References

National Geographic Society
Iggy